The Public Library of Kentucky was opened to the public on April 27, 1872 inside the Central Market building in downtown Louisville, Kentucky, United States. The library consisted of thousands of volumes of books, an art gallery and a museum. It was the dream of its founders to build a museum inside the library that would rival the British Museum of the United Kingdom. However, the dream was a con that brought upon a lottery scandal that shocked Louisville and the world.

History

Since 1816, Louisville, a frontier metropolis, fought to establish a public library for its citizens. Louisville native Reuben T. Durrett helped to create the Public Library of Kentucky and was appointed president to the library. In early 1872 Paul Allan Towne was hired as the librarian.

Louisville finally achieved its goal of opening its first free public library. Books were accumulated through defunct libraries, and placed in its collection. The building's name was changed to Library Hall. This four-story building, located on Fourth Street, offered spaces for the library, museum, classrooms and Festival Hall. It also rented out spaces to help accumulate finances for the library. The vision of the museum was grand, and it was meant to rival the British Museum. Many expanses were paid outto fill the museum and the art gallery with relics and art from around the world.

In 1873, the library purchased the building it occupied.

The Panic of 1873 hit Louisville just like other cities around the world. After many financial complications, one due to a lottery scandal, the library was forced to close in 1875. On April 3, 1875, the Board of Trustees created a resolution to hand over the library and its assets to the librarian, Paul Allen Towne. The library carried with it a debt of $30,000, with $5,000 of fees due to attorneys from the lottery suit.

Towne created  a new society made up of citizens of Louisville to save the library. In 1877, the Library of Kentucky and all its assets, were handed over to Towne's Polytechnic Society of Kentucky.

Founders 

 Reuben T. Durett, president of the Board of Trustees

References

 Breyer, W. R., & Kinkade, E. L. (1944). Libraries and lotteries: a history of the Louisville free public library. Cynthiana, KY: Hobson Press.

Public libraries in Kentucky
Libraries in Louisville, Kentucky